Christine Pascal (29 November 1953 – 30 August 1996) was a French actress, writer and director.

Biography
Born in Lyon, Rhône, Pascal made her film debut at 21 in Michel Mitrani's Les Guichets du Louvre (1974), and began an association with Bertrand Tavernier with her next film, L'Horloger de Saint-Paul (1974). Other films with Tavernier include Que la fête commence (1975), for which she received a César nomination for Best Supporting Actress; The Judge and the Assassin (1976); Des enfants gatés (1977), which she co-scripted; and Round Midnight. Other film appearances include Black Thursday (1974), La Meilleure façon de marcher (1976), The Maids of Wilko (1979), Entre Nous (1983), and Le Grand Chemin (1987). She made her directorial debut with [[Félicité (1979 film)|Félicité]], and also directed La Garce, Zanzibar, Le Petit prince a dit (which won the Louis Delluc Prize) and Adultère, mode d'emploi.

Pascal had contemplated suicide at various times in her life, and Félicité, the first film she directed, opens with a suicide scene. In 1984, when asked how she would like to die, she reputedly said, "En me suicidant, le moment venu." ("By killing myself, when the time comes''.")

In 1996, while staying in a psychiatric hospital in the Paris suburb of Garches, Pascal committed suicide by jumping out of a window. She is buried in Cimetière du Père Lachaise in Paris. In 2003, the psychiatrist who was caring for Pascal was sentenced to one year in prison for failing to take appropriate action to prevent her suicide.

Filmography

As actress

As director

Awards and nominations

References

External links

1953 births
1996 deaths
Actresses from Lyon
Female suicides
French film actresses
French film directors
French women screenwriters
20th-century French screenwriters
Suicides by jumping in France
Burials at Père Lachaise Cemetery
French women film directors
20th-century French actresses
20th-century French women writers
20th-century French non-fiction writers
1996 suicides